Jipocar Czech National Team is a Czech motor racing team, which runs the WRC campaign of Martin Prokop. The team debuted in 2010 and will appear as fully eligible to score WRC manufacturer points team from 2013 Rally Sweden.

The origins of the team can be traced back to the years when Prokop was racing in the support WRC series – Junior World Rally Championship (JWRC) and Production World Rally Championship (PWRC). The team appeared as Czech Ford National Team in 2010. The team and Prokop raced in SWRC with Ford Fiesta S2000. For 2011 the team switched to Ford Fiesta RS WRC, but they were not eligible for scoring manufacturer points as they were not registered as manufacturer or WRC team. The trend was kept in 2012. From 2013 Rally Sweden the team will be eligible to score manufacturer points.

In 2014, the team expanded to run a second car at selected events. This car, entered under the name Slovakia World Rally Team would not be eligible to score manufacturer points.

Complete WRC results

Notes:
 – For the last rally of the season Hrůza was replaced by Michal Ernst.
 – The team was not competing in Manufacturers Championship.
 – The team was eligible to compete for Manufacturer points from Rally Sweden.
 – Jan Tománek replaced Michal Ernst after Rally Monte Carlo.

References

External links 
 Martin Prokop's official website

World Rally Championship teams
Czech auto racing teams
Auto racing teams established in 2010